The first indirect presidential election was held on 24 January 1974. This was the first and last presidential election under a parliamentary system before the presidential system was introduced in January 1975. Mohammad Mohammadullah was elected as the president by the National Assembly without any voting since there were no other candidates. Mohammad Mohammadullah was sworn in at Bangabhaban on 27 January 1974.

References

1974 elections in Bangladesh
Bangladesh
Presidential elections in Bangladesh
January 1974 events in Bangladesh